The Claymore anime series is based on the manga series of the same name by Norihiro Yagi. The episodes are directed by Hiroyuki Tanaka and produced by Madhouse Studios. They adapt the first through eleventh volumes of the manga over 24 episodes. The remaining 2 episodes follow an original storyline not found in the manga written by Yagi. The series aired between April 2007 and September 2007 in Japan on Nippon Television. The series follows the adventures of Clare, a Claymore, or half-human, half-yoma hybrid, and her comrades as they fight for survival in a world filled with yoma, or shapeshifting demons.

Two pieces of theme music are used for the episodes: one opening theme and one ending theme. The ending theme is J-pop singer Riyu Kosaka's single, . A single for "Danzai no Hana~Guilty Sky" was released on May 30, 2007, and the single for "Raison d’être" was released on June 6, 2007.

9 DVD volumes, each containing 3 episodes of the anime, have been released in Japan by Avex Trax. In addition, 5 limited edition sets have been released. The first limited edition set contains the first DVD volume, while the other 4 sets each contain 2 DVD volumes. The latest limited edition set and volumes were released on March 26, 2008. On February 15, 2008, Funimation announced that it has acquired the Region 1 DVD and broadcast licenses for the anime, and it released all series in 6 volumes in North America between fall 2008 and summer 2009.

Episodes

See also

List of Claymore chapters
List of Claymore characters

References

External links
Official website for the Claymore series 
Official Nippon Television website for the Claymore anime series 

Claymore (manga)
Claymore